This is a list of the 78 members of the European Parliament for Italy in the 2004 to 2009 session.

The names in dark blue are MEPs that had already been elected in the European Parliament.

List

Former members

Notes

Italy 2004-2009
List
2004